RNA-binding protein 8A is a protein that in humans is encoded by the RBM8A gene.

This gene encodes a protein with a conserved RNA-binding motif. The protein is found predominantly in the nucleus, although it is also present in the cytoplasm. It is preferentially associated with mRNAs produced by splicing, including both nuclear mRNAs and newly exported cytoplasmic mRNAs. It is thought that the protein remains associated with spliced mRNAs as a tag to indicate where introns had been present, thus coupling pre- and post-mRNA splicing events. Previously, it was thought that two genes encode this protein, RBM8A and RBM8B; it is now thought that the RBM8B locus is a pseudogene. Two alternative start codons result in two forms of the protein, and this gene also uses multiple polyadenylation sites.

Interactions
RBM8A has been shown to interact with IPO13, MAGOH and UPF3A.

Related gene problems
TAR syndrome
1q21.1 deletion syndrome
1q21.1 duplication syndrome

References

Further reading